It was in the late 1960s and early 1970s that the Philippines saw a surge in student activism. This could be chalked up to the onset of the Ferdinand Marcos administration and its declaration of Martial Law, which bore witness to tens of thousands of human rights violations, among many others. There are, however, several factors and events in Philippine history that contributed to the increase in student activism during this period. In fact, economic decline, increase in unemployment rates, the growth of intra-elite conflicts, and internal dissension and disruption all factored into the context of student activism in the Philippines. It was around this time that businesses in Manila tried to find opportunities to withdraw when the city started to be deemed unsafe. Five Communist oriented guerrillas in the countryside had also regained some of the momentum similar to the Huks had before they were contained by Magsaysay in the 1950s. The coming of a revolution was considered a possibility waiting to happen at one point as riots and demonstrations erupted, causing colleges to be closed down. All of these culminated in an effort to storm the Malacañang.

The mobilization of the studentry 
The mobilization of students during this period trained a huge number of activists who later joined the underground opposition, the New People's Army, after the declaration of Martial Law in 1972. This imposition caused democratic institutions that permitted these mobilizations to be closed down, forcing activists to turn to radicals. It was, however, introducing social reform as the focus of the ideology that drove the mobilization of Filipino students during the first phase. These moderates were organized and represented through the National Union of Students of the Philippines (NUSP), a dominant force in the student movements during the late 1960s. In 1970, moderates initially led the student movements but due to the dynamics of the political conflicts, radicals soon gained the upper hand in these movements. The expansion of higher education and the atmosphere present in the country at that time gave way for Filipino students to become increasingly critical and collectively engaged.

It is worth noting that students were at the forefront of several movements and even became the most active and participative group in the scene of politics. In the years 1970 and 1971 alone, student activists participated in 214 demonstrations and 39 class boycotts, and as reported in The Manila Times, issued 72 statements. They joined forces and established coalitions with reformists and radical factions of working classes and even participated in 76 demonstrations alongside farmers and workers.

The Communist Party of the Philippines (CPP)/Partido Komunista ng Pilipinas (PKP) 
The CPP/PKP was one party that played an important role in mobilizing student movements in the country. While the CPP/PKP leadership initially dismissed them as "unneeded," there were small underground cells in some schools that played support roles to the more important and bigger Party cells in the factories and among the peasantry.

The political value of students was recognized more by the Americans who realized that students were adept as publicity (propaganda) and pressure groups for government reforms and against the PKP-led Huk rebellion of the 1950s. The Party only began recognizing their importance in the 1960s when self-taught Marxists spearheaded an anti-clerical and nationalist campaign at the University of the Philippines. Radicals who were brought into the Party's fold formed Kabataang Makabayan (KM) in 1964.

Shortly thereafter, however, this youth faction was expelled from the party. Led by Jose Maria Sison, they "re-established" the CPP/PKP, calling it the Communist Party of the Philippines—Marxist–Leninist–Mao Zedong Thought (CPP-MLM), setting themselves apart from the original, lesser-known party solely known today as the Partido Komunista ng Pilipinas-1930 (PKP-1930).

What became the CPP-MLM's most immediate concern was cadre recruitment and training; being a party composed of practically urban intellectuals and students who lacked revolutionary experience.

Some notable events leading up to the declaration of martial law

The First Quarter Storm 
The nationwide student demonstration that took place on January 26, 1970, proved how militant student organizations had achieved a high level of organization and commitment from its followers. The violent demonstrations that would extend to March of that same year would become known as the First Quarter Storm.

The Battle of Mendiola 
On January 30, 1970, some 10,000 chanting students and laborers marched across Mendiola Bridge in an attempt to storm the Malacañang. Upon their arrival at the gates of the palace, they commandeered a fire truck and rammed it through the main gate. Despite their efforts to penetrate the palace, the Metropolitan Command (METROCOM) of the Philippine Constabulary repulsed them towards Mendiola Bridge.

Primitivo Mijares, in The Conjugal Dictatorship of Ferdinand and Imelda Marcos, recounts that what followed was the so-called "Battle of Mendiola," which pitted young boys and girls armed with bamboo sticks and stones against Armalite-wielding 'shock troops' of Marcos from the Presidential Guard Battalion. "It was a massacre", he adds.

The Diliman Commune 
The Diliman Commune was a nine-day uprising at the University of the Philippines-Diliman from February 1 to February 9, 1971. It started out as a peaceful rally in which students voiced their support for the ongoing strike against the oil price hike and escalated into an uprising in which students, supported by the school administration, protested against military incursions into the university.

The Plaza Miranda Bombing 
On August 21, 1971, four grenades were hurled at the stage of the Liberal Party's grand miting de avance at Plaza Miranda in Quiapo, Manila, killing nine and wounding 95 others. A great number of the Party's leaders and senatorial candidates were seriously injured.

This caused a great wave of public outrage and sparked disgust towards a system that seemed to tolerate senseless acts of violence. This prompted Marcos to suspend the writ of habeas corpus a month later. It was restored in January 1972, with talks of an imminent revolution already rife.

Movement of Concerned Citizens for Civil Liberties (MCCCL) Rallies 
The military used the suspension of the write of habeas corpus to their advantage to arrest well-known activists such as Luzvimindo David of KM and Gary Olivar of the Movement for a Democratic Philippines (MDP) and swoop down on headquarters of several mass movements.

The people responded by vigorously opposing the threat of a fascist rule. Led by Jose W. Diokno, an enormous alliance of civil libertarians, progressive Constitutional Convention delegates, students, professionals, workers came together to form the Movement of Concerned Citizens for Civil Liberties (MCCCL).

Their three basic demands were as follows: a) lifting the writ of habeas corpus; b) release of political prisoners; and c) resistance of plan by Marcos government to declare martial law.

The alliance proved to be successful as they managed to forge unity among diverse groups such as those from the 'Nat-Dem' and 'Soc-Dem' groups as well as various civic organizations on the bases of these demands. In rally after rally attended by as many as 50,000 people, the MCCCL warned of the imminence of martial law even as the writ of habeas corpus was eventually restored. It held the biggest demonstration on September 21, 1972.

The declaration of martial law in 1972 
On September 21, 1972, Marcos declared Martial Law.

Gregg Jones, an American author, writes, "Martial law left the once-formidable legal protest movement in disarray, its leaders in hiding or in prison, its activists driven into the underground or cowering in fear." This is not to say that political protest vanished entirely, however; as he elaborates, "In the late 1970s, against the backdrop of a weakening economy, communist efforts to rebuild an urban protest movement were beginning to bear fruit."

Student activism in universities

University of the Philippines Diliman (UP Diliman) 
As far back as the 1950s, the University of the Philippines has been the breeding ground of many intellectuals and radical activists. It comes as no surprise, then, that in the 1960s and 1970s, the university played an active role in conducting demonstrations, marches, and rallies to raise awareness of sectoral struggles and to campaign against the Marcos dictatorship and land reform policy, among others. Some of the clear examples of the school's activism include the ratifying of the Diliman Declaration in March 1969.

Student activists from the university stirred up the masses of youth and the working class to conduct protest actions, from the March 1961 demonstration of 5,000 UP student demonstrators that scuttled the anti-communist witch-hunt of the Committee on Anti-Filipino Activities (CAFA) to the 1970 First Quarter Storm that rocked the National Capital Region with almost weekly marches and rallies of 50,000 to 100,000 people campaigning against the administration. Among the youth organizations that were active include Student Christian Movement of the Philippines, College Editors Guild of the Philippines, League of Filipino Students, and NUSP.

The Diliman Commune 

In 1971, students who formed the "Diliman Commune", supported by faculty members and non-academic personnel, occupied the Diliman campus and barricaded roads to protest deteriorating conditions in the country during the administration.

Salvador P. Lopez, then president, urged his students, faculty, and employees to maintain the autonomy of the university as the military sought control of the campus in order to identify suspected leftists, activists, and critiques.

Ateneo de Manila University (AdMU) 
Several activists from the Ateneo de Manila University (AdMU), most notably Edgardo Gil "Edjop" Jopson, founder of the single biggest student union at the time, National Union of Students of the Philippines (NUSP) and Ferdidand "Ferdie" Arceo, founder of Ligang Demokratiko ng Ateneo (LDA), played vital roles in campaigning to overthrow the dictatorship. Among the other well-known activists from the university are Lazaro "Lazzie" Silva, Jr. and William "Bill" Begg, active members of Samahang Demokratiko ng Kabataan sa Loyola (SDK-L) and Kabataang Makabayan-Ateneo (KM), respectively, and Artemio "Jun" Celestial, Jr., a member of the Student Catholic Action and the secretary-general of the student government.

Founding of Ligang Demokratiko ng Ateneo (LDA) 
Ferdie, together with like-minded students in AdMU, established LDA in 1970, the first radical activist organization in Ateneo. Members conducted discussion groups, recruited students, advised student leaders, and created a space for dialogue among members of the student body. Eventually, LDA split into two separate organizations, SDK-L and KM.

The National Union of Students (NUSP) Iloilo Conference 
During the NUSP's 13th annual conference in 1969, Edjop was elected as president. When delegates returned to Manila, they led a huge rally in front of congress; all while President Marcos was delivering his State of the Nation Address (SONA).

Under Edjop's two-term tenure, the National Union became participative in socio-political issues amidst the First Quarter Storm that brought forth the Second Propaganda Movement.

De La Salle University (DLSU)  
At the De La Salle University, then De La Salle College, student activists clashed with the school administration over matters involving the Brother Becker Case, NROTC, tuition fees, and student rights and academic freedom. The activists questioned the elitist orientation of the institution and campaigned for a more nationalistic education.

The Filipinization of Education 
The prevalence of the affluent was one of the issues that was brought up in the 1960s; it was a question of whether the "wide-cross section of the public" could be "represented." Questioning why a Philippine institution had an administrator who was American, textbooks that were written by foreigners, and instruction that was done in English, student activists urged the administration to adopt a "more nationalistic" stance. Included in this was their call for the "Filipinization of education" by ousting non-Filipino presidents of schools, colleges, and universities, and appointing qualified Filipinos to head the institutions in their place.

The Brother Becker Case 
On Friday afternoon of December 6, 1968, more than 600 students held a four-hour demonstration to show their support for Brother Edward Becker FSC who was dismissed by the college. They circulated leaflets which divulged the imputations hurled against Becker.

This case provided the students the opportunity to voice their concerns regarding academic freedom as well as student rights. Arthur Aguilar, Student Council chairman, eventually managed to steer the dialogue away from the Becker case, in a meeting with Brother H. Gabriel Connon FSC and Dr. Waldo Perfecto, academic vice-president, on December 8, 1968, during the feast of the Immaculate Conception. He declared that the "issue was only incidental and the Becker case was merely a catalyst, the 'final straw' so to speak which ignited student protest over school policies."

Reserve Officers' Training Corps (ROTC)  
On July 17, 1971, some 600 cadets refused to attend an NROTC drill, with their refusal stemming from their dissatisfaction with the present NROTC system as well as their protest against the hazing of Shore Patrol trainees by probationary officers. The Student Council backed this boycott in a resolution.

References 

Students in the Philippines
History of the Philippines (1965–1986)